The 1979 Arkansas Razorbacks baseball team represented the University of Arkansas in the 1979 NCAA Division I baseball season. The Razorbacks played their home games at George Cole Field, and was led by tenth year head coach Norm DeBriyn. They finished as the national runner-up after falling to Cal State Fullerton in the 1979 College World Series Final.

Roster

Schedule 

! style="" | Regular Season
|- valign="top" 

|- align="center" bgcolor="ccffcc"
| February 23 ||  || George Cole Field || 7–1 || 1–0 || –
|- align="center" bgcolor="ccffcc"
| February 23 || William Jewell || George Cole Field || 13–2 || 2–0 || –
|- align="center" bgcolor="ccffcc"
| February 27 ||  || George Cole Field || 5–0 || 3–0 || –
|- align="center" bgcolor="ccffcc"
| February 27 || Missouri Southern || George Cole Field || 3–2 || 4–0 || –
|-

|- align="center" bgcolor="ccffcc"
| March 2 || Texas || George Cole Field || 2–0 || 5–0 || 1–0
|- align="center" bgcolor="ffcccc"
| March 3 || Texas || George Cole Field || 2–3 || 5–1 || 1–1
|- align="center" bgcolor="ffcccc"
| March 3 || Texas || George Cole Field || 0–1 || 5–2 || 1–2
|- align="center" bgcolor="ffcccc"
| March 4 ||  || George Cole Field || 2–3 || 5–3 || 1–2
|- align="center" bgcolor="ffcccc"
| March 4 || Southern Illinois || George Cole Field || 5–18 || 5–4 || 1–2
|- align="center" bgcolor="ccffcc"
| March 5 ||  || George Cole Field || 5–0 || 6–4 || 1–2
|- align="center" bgcolor="ccffcc"
| March 5 || Southwest Baptist || George Cole Field || 9–2 || 7–4 || 1–2
|- align="center" bgcolor="ccffcc"
| March 6 ||  || George Cole Field || 4–1 || 8–4 || 1–2
|- align="center" bgcolor="ccffcc"
| March 6 || Tulsa || George Cole Field || 8–1 || 9–4 || 1–2
|- align="center" bgcolor="ccffcc"
| March 9 || at  || Cameron Field || 6–3 || 10–4 || 2–2
|- align="center" bgcolor="ccffcc"
| March 10 || at Rice || Cameron Field || 8–1 || 11–4 || 3–2
|- align="center" bgcolor="ccffcc"
| March 10 || at Rice || Cameron Field || 12–3 || 12–4 || 4–2
|- align="center" bgcolor="ccffcc"
| March 16 ||  || George Cole Field || 12–1 || 13–4 || 5–2
|- align="center" bgcolor="ccffcc"
| March 17 || Texas || George Cole Field || 5–1 || 14–4 || 6–2
|- align="center" bgcolor="ffcccc"
| March 17 || Texas || George Cole Field || 0–4 || 14–5 || 6–3
|- align="center" bgcolor="ccffcc"
| March 19 ||  || George Cole Field || 13–0 || 15–5 || 6–3
|- align="center" bgcolor="ccffcc"
| March 19 || Missouri Western || George Cole Field || 7–6 || 16–5 || 6–3
|- align="center" bgcolor="ccffcc"
| March 23 || at  || TCU Diamond || 7–1 || 17–5 || 7–3
|- align="center" bgcolor="ccffcc"
| March 24 || at TCU || TCU Diamond || 10–1 || 18–5 || 8–3
|- align="center" bgcolor="ccffcc"
| March 24 || at TCU || TCU Diamond || 9–4 || 19–5 || 9–3
|- align="center" bgcolor="ccffcc"
| March 26 ||  || George Cole Field || 6–2 || 20–5 || 9–3
|- align="center" bgcolor="ccffcc"
| March 26 || Eastern Michigan || George Cole Field || 1–0 || 21–5 || 9–3
|- align="center" bgcolor="ccffcc"
| March 27 ||  || George Cole Field || 7–4 || 22–5 || 9–3
|- align="center" bgcolor="ccffcc"
| March 27 || Eastern Michigan || George Cole Field || 6–0 || 23–5 || 9–3
|- align="center" bgcolor="ccffcc"
| March 30 ||  || George Cole Field || 3–1 || 24–5 || 10–3
|- align="center" bgcolor="ccffcc"
| March 31 || SMU || George Cole Field || 3–1 || 25–5 || 11–3
|- align="center" bgcolor="ccffcc"
| March 31 || SMU || George Cole Field || 9–2 || 26–5 || 12–3
|-

|- align="center" bgcolor="ccffcc"
| April 3 ||  || George Cole Field || 5–1 || 27–5 || 12–3
|- align="center" bgcolor="ccffcc"
| April 3 || Southwest Missouri State || George Cole Field || 4–3 || 28–5 || 12–3
|- align="center" bgcolor="ffcccc"
| April 6 || at  || Tech Diamond || 8–9 || 28–6 || 12–4
|- align="center" bgcolor="ccffcc"
| April 7 || at Texas Tech || Tech Diamond || 6–2 || 29–6 || 13–4
|- align="center" bgcolor="ccffcc"
| April 7 || at Texas Tech || Tech Diamond || 12–9 || 30–6 || 14–4
|- align="center" bgcolor="ccffcc"
| April 13 ||  || George Cole Field || 4–0 || 31–6 || 14–4
|- align="center" bgcolor="ccffcc"
| April 13 || South Dakota || George Cole Field || 7–0 || 32–6 || 14–4
|- align="center" bgcolor="ccffcc"
| April 14 || South Dakota || George Cole Field || 7–1 || 33–6 || 14–4
|- align="center" bgcolor="ccffcc"
| April 14 || South Dakota || George Cole Field || 8–1 || 34–6 || 14–4
|- align="center" bgcolor="ffcccc"
| April 17 || at  || J. L. Johnson Stadium || 2–5 || 34–7 || 14–4
|- align="center" bgcolor="ccffcc"
| April 20 ||  || George Cole Field || 5–3 || 35–7 || 15–4
|- align="center" bgcolor="ccffcc"
| April 21 || Houston || George Cole Field || 3–0 || 36–7 || 16–4
|- align="center" bgcolor="ccffcc"
| April 21 || Houston || George Cole Field || 11–10 || 37–7 || 17–4
|- align="center" bgcolor="ffcccc"
| April 27 || at  || Olsen Field || 0–6 || 37–8 || 17–5
|- align="center" bgcolor="ccffcc"
| April 28 || at Texas A&M || Olsen Field || 2–0 || 38–8 || 18–5
|- align="center" bgcolor="ccffcc"
| April 28 || at Texas A&M || Olsen Field || 9–1 || 39–8 || 19–5
|-

|- align="center" bgcolor="#ffcccc"
| May  || at Missouri Southern || Warren Turner Field || 8–9 || 39–9 || 19–5
|- align="center" bgcolor="#ccffcc"
| May  || at Missouri Southern || Warren Turner Field || 6–5 || 40–9 || 19–5
|- align="center" bgcolor="#ffcccc"
| May  || at Wichita State || Eck Stadium || 6–7 || 40–10 || 19–5
|- align="center" bgcolor="#ffcccc"
| May  || at Wichita State || Eck Stadium || 4–5 || 40–11 || 19–5
|-

|-
! style="" | Postseason
|- valign="top"

|- align="center" bgcolor="#ccffcc"
| May 12 || vs Baylor || UFCU Disch–Falk Field || 6–1 || 41–11 || 19–5
|- align="center" bgcolor="#ffcccc"
| May 13 || at Texas || UFCU Disch–Falk Field || 2–6 || 41–12 || 19–5
|- align="center" bgcolor="#ccffcc"
| May 14 || vs Texas A&M || UFCU Disch–Falk Field  || 6–2 || 42–12 || 19–5
|- align="center" bgcolor="#ffcccc"
| May 15 || at Texas || UFCU Disch–Falk Field  || 6–12 || 42–13 || 19–5
|-

|- align="center" bgcolor="#ccffcc"
| May 25 ||  || Tallahassee, FL || 12–11 || 43–13 || 19–5
|- align="center" bgcolor="#ccffcc"
| May 26 ||  || Tallahassee, FL || 9–1 || 44–13 || 19–5
|- align="center" bgcolor="#ccffcc"
| May 27 ||  || Tallahassee, FL || 8–6 || 45–13 || 19–5
|- align="center" bgcolor="#ccffcc"
| May 28 || Delaware || Tallahassee, FL || 4–3 || 46–13 || 19–5
|-

|- align="center" bgcolor="#ccffcc"
| June 1 || vs  || Johnny Rosenblatt Stadium || 5–4 || 47–13 || 19–5
|- align="center" bgcolor="#ccffcc"
| June 3 || vs Arizona || Johnny Rosenblatt Stadium || 10–3 || 48–13 || 19–5
|- align="center" bgcolor="#ccffcc"
| June 5 || vs Texas || Johnny Rosenblatt Stadium || 9–4 || 49–13 || 19–5
|- align="center" bgcolor="#ffcccc"
| June 6 || vs Cal State Fullerton || Johnny Rosenblatt Stadium || 10–13 || 49–14 || 19–5
|- align="center" bgcolor="#ffcccc"
| June 8 || vs Cal State Fullerton || Johnny Rosenblatt Stadium || 1–2 || 49–15 || 19–5
|-

Razorbacks in the 1979 MLB Draft 
The following members of the Arkansas Razorbacks baseball program were drafted in the 1979 Major League Baseball Draft.

References 

Arkansas
Arkansas Razorbacks baseball seasons
Arkansas Razorbacks baseball
College World Series seasons